Principles of Optics, colloquially known as Born and Wolf, is an optics textbook written by Max Born and Emil Wolf that was initially published in 1959 by Pergamon Press. After going through six editions with Pergamon Press, the book was transferred to Cambridge University Press who issued an expanded seventh edition in 1999. A 60th anniversary edition was published in 2019 with a foreword by Sir Peter Knight. It is considered a classic science book and one of the most influential optics books of the twentieth century.

Background 
In 1933, Springer published Max Born's book “Optik”; this dealt with all optical phenomena for which the methods of classical physics, and Maxwell's equations in particular, were applicable. In 1950, with encouragement from Sir Edward Appleton, the principal of Edinburgh University, Born decided to produce an updated version of his “Optik” book in English.  He was partly motivated by the need to make money, as he had not been working long enough at Edinburgh to earn a decent pension, and at that time, was not entitled to any pension from his time working in Germany.

The first problem that Born had to tackle was that after the US joined the war in 1941, “Optik” had been reproduced and sold widely in the US, along with many other books and periodicals.  This had been done under the aegis of the Office of Alien Property which was authorised to confiscate enemy property, so that neither the authors nor the publishers received any payment for these sales. When the war ended, the printing continued, still with no payment of royalties to authors or publishers. Born had been writing regularly to try and reclaim his book, pointing out that he was not an alien, as he had been a British citizen at the start of the war. He enlisted the support of various people and organisations, including the British Ambassador in Washington. In response, he got a letter saying that he would have to pay 2% of the retail price of any new book he wrote which was based on “Optik”.  An article in the Manchester Guardian about how Jean Sibelius had been deprived of royalties in the same way, prompted him to write a letter describing his own situation. Eventually, his rights to the book were returned and he received backdated royalties.

He quickly realised that the important developments in optics which had occurred in the years since the original book had been written would need to be covered. He approached Dennis Gabor, the inventor of holography to collaborate with him in writing the book.  Emil Wolf, a research assistant at Cambridge University, was invited to write a chapter in the book. Gabor subsequently dropped out because of time constraints. Born and Wolf were then the main authors with specialist contributions from other authors. Wolf wrote several chapters and edited the other contributions; Born's input was a modified version of “Optik” and also collaboration with Wolf in the planning of the book, and many discussions concerning disputed points, presentation and so on.

They hoped to complete the book by the end of 1951, but they were "much too optimistic". The book was actually first published in December 1959.

Problems with Pergamon Press and Robert Maxwell

Pergamon Press was a scientific publishing company which was set up in 1948 by Robert Maxwell and Paul Rosbaud. The latter had been a scientific advisor for Springer in Germany before and during the war and was one of the editors dealing with "Optik". He was also an undercover agent for the Allies during the war.  He persuaded the authors to place the book with Pergamon Press, a decision which they would later regret.  

A detailed account is given by Gustav Born, Max's son   He explains how the libel laws in the UK prevented him from speaking about this until after Maxwell's death.

Maxwell tried to get the authors to agree to a much lower rate of royalties for US sales than was agreed in their contract because the book was to be marketed by a different publisher which would mean reduced profits for Pergamon.   It was then actually marketed through the US branch of Pergamon but the authors still received reduced royalties.  They also found that the sales figures in their statements were lower than the true figues. A clause in the contract meant that they had to go to arbitration rather than go to court to resolve this.  Gustav acted for his father in the matter as Max Born was now living in Germany and was in his late seventies. The case was heard by Desmond Ackner(later Lord Ackner) in 1962. He found in favour of the authors on all counts.  Nonetheless, they continued to be underpaid. Opening figures in one year's statement did not agree with closing figures from the previous year's statement. Some editions were reprinted several times but did not appear in the accounts at all.   After Born's death, Wolf found that an international edition was being distributed in the Far East which he had not been told about. Pergamon sent him a small cheque when he raised the matter with them.  When he threatened them with legal action, they sent another cheque for three times the amount. Wolf said  that the book was re-printed seventeen times (not counting unauthorized editions and translations).

Rosbaud left Pergamon Press in 1956 “because he found Maxwell to be completely dishonest”. Other authors told Gustav Born that they had had the same problems with Maxwell.  They included Sir Henry Dale, who shared the Nobel prize in medicine in 1936 and Edward Appleton.

Contents

1st edition
The book aimed to cover only those optical phenomena which can be derived from Maxwell's electromagnetic theory and is intended to give a complete picture of what was then known derived from Maxwell's equations.

2nd Edition

This was published in 1962. It contained corrections of errors and misprints.

Lasers had been developed since the 1st edition was published but were not covered because laser operation is outside the scope of classical optics.  Some references to research which used lasers were included.

3rd Edition

This was published in 1965. It again had correction of errors and misprints, and references to recent publications were added.

A new figure (8.54), donated by Leith and Upatnieks, showed images of the first 3-dimensional holographic image. This related to the section in Chapter VIII which described Gabor's wavefront re-construction technique.

4th Edition

This was published in 1968 and included corrections, improvements to the text, and additional references.

5th Edition

This was published in 1974 and again included corrections, improvements to the text, and additional references.

Significant changes were made to Sections 13.1-13.3. which deals with the optical properties of metals. It is not possible to describe the interaction of an optical electromagnetic wave with a metal using classical optical theory.  Nonetheless, some of the main features can be described, at least in quantitative terms, provided the frequency dependence of conductivity and the role of free and bound electrons are taken into account.

6th Edition

This was published in 1985, and contained a small number of corrections

7th Edition

In 1997, publication of the book was transferred to Cambridge University Press, who were willing to reset the text, thus providing an opportunity to make substantial changes to the book.

The invention of the laser in 1960, a year after the first edition was published, had led to many new activities and entirely new fields in optics. A fully updated "Principles of Optics" would have required several new volumes so Wolf decided to add only a few new topics, which would not require major revisions to the text.

A new section was added to Chapter IV, which presents the principles of computerised axial tomography, known as CAT which has revolutionised diagnosis in medicine. There is an account of the Radon transform developed in 1917, which underlies the theory of CAT.

An account of Kirchhoff-Rayleigh diffraction theory was added to Chapter VIII as it had become more popular.  There is a debate as to whether it or the older Kirchhoff theory best describes diffraction effects.

A recently discovered phenomenon is presented, in which spectral analysis of the  light distribution of superimposed broad-band light fields provides important physical information from which the coherence properties of the light can be deduced.

Chapter XIII was added, entitled "The theory of scattering of light by inhomogeneous media".  The underlying theory was developed many years before in the analysis of the quantum mechanical potential scattering, and had more recently been derived for optical scattering.  Diffraction tomography is discussed. It is applied when the finite wavelength of the waves involved, e.g. optical and ultrasonic waves, cannot be ignored as is the case in X-ray tomography.

Three new appendices were also added:
 Proof of the inequality for the spectral degree of coherence
 Evaluation of two integrals
 Proof of Jones' lemma

Publication history 

To date, there have been seven editions of the book.

The first six were published by Pergamon Press in 1959, 1962, 1965, 1968, 1974 and 1980. Cambridge University Press took over the book in 1997, and published an expanded seventh edition in 1999  A special Sixtieth Anniversary version was released in 2019, sixty years after the first edition.

Original editions

Reprints

In 1999, Wolf commented  that there had been seventeen authorised reprints and an unknown number of unauthorised reprints.

The fifth edition was reprinted in 1975 and 1977. Between 1983 and 1993, the sixth edition of the book was reprinted seven times. Some of these reprints, including those in the years 1983 and 1986, included corrections.

Cambridge University Press produced a reprint of the 6th Edition in 1997. A reprint of the 7th Edition was produced in 2002 with corrections. Fifteen reprints were made before the 60th Anniversary edition was printed in 2019.

Translations

Reception 

The first edition was very well received. A biography of Max Born said:  "it presents a systematic treatment based on electromagnetic theory for all optical phenomena that can be described in terms of a continuous distribution of matter". Its timing was very opportune. The arrival of the laser shortly after its publication meant that the insights it provided into the description and analysis of light were directly applicable to the behaviour of laser light. It was extensively used by university teachers, researchers used it as a source of rigorous information. Its excellent sales reflected  its value to the world optics community.

Gabor said that the account of holography in the book was the first systematic description of the technique in an authoritative text book.  Gabor sent Wolf a copy of one of his papers with the inscription "Dear Emil, I consider you my chief prophet, Love, Dennis" 

The seventh edition was reviewed by Peter W. Milonni, Eugene Hecht, and William Maxwell Steen. Previous editions of the book were reviewed by Léon Rosenfeld, Walter Thompson Welford, John D. Strong, and Edgar Adrian, among others.

Peter W. Milonni opened his review of the book by endorsing the book's dust jacket description, stating it is "one of the classic science books of the twentieth century, and probably the most influential book in optics published in the past 40 years."

Eugene Hecht opened his review of the book by comparing the task to reviewing The Odyssey, in that it "cannot be approached without a certain awe and the foreknowledge that whatever you say is essentially irrelevant". Hecht then summarizes his own review, in order to help "anyone who hasn't the time to read the rest of this essay" by stating: "Principles of Optics is a great book, the seventh edition is a fine one, and if you work in the field you probably ought to own it." Hecht went on to state that the book "is a great, rigorous, ponderous, unwavering mathematical tract that deals with a wealth of topics in classical optics." He noted that the book can be hard to understand; he wrote: "This is a tour de force, never meant for easy reading." After analyzing some of the changes to the new edition, Hecht ended the review with the same summary as the introduction, emphasizing again that "if you work in the field you probably ought to own it".

See also 

 Bibliography of Max Born
 List of textbooks in electromagnetism

References

Further reading

External links 
 
 
 
 
 

1959 non-fiction books
1964 non-fiction books
1965 non-fiction books
1970 non-fiction books
1975 non-fiction books
1980 non-fiction books
1999 non-fiction books
2019 non-fiction books
Max Born
Optics
Physics education in the United Kingdom
Physics textbooks
Pergamon Press books